Imre Augustich or Agostich ( September 29/30, 1837 – July 17, 1879) was a Slovene writer, poet, journalist, and representative of Vas county in the National Assembly of Hungary. He was the author of Prijátel (Friend), the first newspaper in Prekmurje Slovene.

Augustich was born in Murski Petrovci (Prekmurje). His father, Lajos Augustich, was a petty nobleman and economic officer for the Szapáry family. His mother, Julianna Zanaty, was born in Szombathely. Augustich studied in Szombathely and Budapest, and early in his career was a notary for the Batthyány family in Murska Sobota and Alsószölnök, and became a reporter and journalist in Budapest.

The first works that Augustich wrote in Hungarian supported magyarization in the Slovene March. Augustich translated verses by Sándor Petőfi, János Arany, Pál Gyulai, and others, at the same time renewing Prekmurje Slovene language and literature.

He died of tuberculosis in Budapest.

Works 
 A polgári házasság. Népszerű jog- és társadalmi tudomány dr. H-ain és dr. Ch-nd után. (Pest, 1868.)
 Návuk vogerszkoga jezika za zacsetnike. Budapest, 1876.
 Prirodopis s kepami, 1879
 Prijátel 1875–1879

Literature 
 Szinnyei József: Magyar írók élete és munkái I. (Aachs–Bzenszki). Budapest: Hornyánszky. 1891. → Augustich (Agostich) Imre
 Natalija Ulčnik: Začetki prekmurskega časopisja, Zora 67, 2009. Maribor 
 Anton Trstenjak: Slovenci na Ogrskem, Narodnapisna in književna črtica, OBJAVA ARHIVSKIH VIROV Maribor 2006. 
 Vilko Novak: Izbor prekmurskega slovstva, Ljubljana 1976.

See also 

 List of Slovene writers and poets in Hungary

Slovenian writers and poets in Hungary
Slovenian journalists
Hungarian journalists
Hungarian Slovenes
Hungarian male poets
1837 births
1879 deaths
19th-century journalists
Male journalists
19th-century Hungarian poets
People from the Municipality of Tišina
19th-century Hungarian male writers